Deepan may refer to:

Deepan Chakravarthy, Indian singer
Deepan Budlakoti (born 1989), Involved in citizenship dispute
Deepan Sivaraman, Indian theatre director
Chakkravarthy Deepan (born 1987), Chess grandmaster
Deepan (1972–2017), film director

Indian given names